Burger Point is a cape in Hoonah–Angoon Census Area, Alaska, in the United States.

The name Burger Point was recorded by the United States Geological Survey in 1926.

References

Headlands of Alaska
Landforms of Hoonah–Angoon Census Area, Alaska